USS Daraga (SP-43) was a United States Navy patrol boat in commission from 1917 to 1919.

Daraga, a motorboat, was purchased by the Navy in 1917, commissioned on 23 April 1917 with Ensign A. F. Spare, USNRF, commanding.

Daraga was assigned to the 2nd Naval District where she performed harbor entrance patrol duty at Newport, Rhode Island, and served as mother ship to Patrol Squadron 1 until the end of World War I.

In 1919 Daraga was transferred to the 1st Naval District and decommissioned. She was sold on 7 July 1921.

References 
 
 Dictionary of American Naval Fighting Ships
 Department of the Navy: Naval Historical Center: Online Library of Selected Images: Daraga (American Motor Boat, 1915). Served as USS Daraga (SP-43) in 1917-1921.
 NavSource Online: Section Patrol Craft Photo Archive – Daraga (SP 43)

World War I patrol vessels of the United States
Patrol vessels of the United States Navy
1915 ships